Liam Phillip Smith (born 28 September 1995) is an English professional footballer who plays as a midfielder for Hebburn Town.

Smith graduated from the Newcastle United Academy in 2015, signing his first professional contract with the club.

In March 2016, Smith joined Blackpool on a two-month youth loan deal. He made his professional debut in Blackpool's match against Coventry City in March 2016, and played seven further games.

In July 2016, Smith was signed on loan through to January 2017 by Crewe Alexandra, though he suffered an ankle injury during pre-season and returned to Newcastle for treatment, returning to Crewe in September. He suffered a second ankle injury shortly after his return to Crewe Alexandra and returned to Newcastle United, having made no appearances for the League Two side. In August 2017, Smith played for Newcastle United U21s in an EFL Trophy group stage game against Crewe at Gresty Road, and scored his side's opening goal in the 4th minute of a 2–1 win.

Smith was released by Newcastle in 2018. After several years without a club, he joined Hebburn Town on 3rd November 2021.

Career statistics

References

External links
 
 Newcastle United profile

1995 births
Living people
Association football midfielders
English footballers
Newcastle United F.C. players
Blackpool F.C. players
Footballers from Newcastle upon Tyne